"Mary Hamilton" is a song.

Mary Hamilton may also refer to:

 Mary Hamilton, also known as Charles Hamilton (female husband) (born c. 1721–1724), woman who married while living as a man
 Mary Hamilton (lady in waiting) (died 1719), lady in waiting
 Lady Mary Hamilton (1736–1821), Scottish novelist
 Mary Hamilton (politician) (1882–1966), Scottish politician
 Mary Hamilton (equestrian), equestrian from New Zealand
 Mary Hamilton, Duchess of Abercorn (1848–1929), English aristocrat
 Mary Lou Graham Hamilton, baseball player
 Mary Hamilton (equestrian), New Zealand equestrian
 Mary Riter Hamilton (1873–1954), Canadian World War I painter
 Mary Barbara Hamilton, the birth name of Barbara Cartland, author
 Mary Hamilton (activist) (1935–2002), American activist in the Civil Rights Movement
 Mary Hamilton (Arrowverse), a fictional character in the Arrowverse franchise

See also 

Mary Hamilton Frye (1890–1951), American stained glass artist and children's book illustrator
Mary Victoria Douglas-Hamilton (1850–1922), Hereditary Princess of Monaco

Hamilton, Mary